Mauricetown (pronounced "Morristown") is a census-designated place and unincorporated community that is part of Commercial Township in Cumberland County, in the U.S. state of New Jersey.

The construction of County Route 649, a modern bypass road, has significantly reduced traffic through the community, resulting in a quiet, tranquil atmosphere with minimal automobile congestion. Mauricetown is a small, gridded town consisting of two main roads running east–west and three side streets running north–south, forming about 10 blocks of mostly residential buildings. The settlement is built on high ground overlooking the Maurice River, which supported Mauricetown's economic boom during the 19th century, when the community was active in coastal trade and shipbuilding. Mauricetown proper is surrounded on three sides by the grassy salt marshes, tidal flats, small creeks, and the Maurice River, and is located about  upriver from the Delaware Bay. The building stock is mostly historic, with the large majority being houses built between 1790 and 1900.  The Caesar Hoskins Log Cabin, one of the earliest buildings in Mauricetown and all of southern New Jersey, is listed on the National Register of Historic Places. 

The area is served as United States Postal Service ZIP code 08329. As of the 2020 United States Census, the population for Mauricetown was 403. in the 2010 census the population for ZIP Code Tabulation Area 08329 was 221.

Demographics

Historic district

The Mauricetown Historic District is a  historic district encompassing the community roughly along Highland Street. It was added to the National Register of Historic Places on March 29, 2018, for its significance in architecture, commerce, and maritime history from 1815 to 1930. The district includes 118 contributing buildings and one contributing structure. The Caesar Hoskins Log Cabin is part of the district.

Notable buildings
Abraham and Ann Hoy House
Elkinton-Butcher House
Captain Edward Compton House
Captain Isaac Peterson House
David Compton House
James Compton House
Mauricetown United Methodist Church
Sharp-Mickle House
John Wills House
Hunter-Harris House

Gallery

Notable people

People who were born in, residents of, or otherwise closely associated with Mauricetown include:
 Henry C. Loudenslager (1852–1911), represented New Jersey's 1st congressional district from 1893 to 1911.
 Dallas Lore Sharp (1870–1929), author, naturalist and university professor.

See also
 National Register of Historic Places listings in Cumberland County, New Jersey

References

External links
 
 
 
 
 
Mauricetown Historical Society

Commercial Township, New Jersey
Unincorporated communities in Cumberland County, New Jersey
Unincorporated communities in New Jersey
Historic American Buildings Survey in New Jersey
Historic American Engineering Record in New Jersey